Lipogramma is a genus of fish in the family Grammatidae native to the Atlantic Ocean.

Species
There are currently 10 recognized species in this genus:
 Lipogramma anabantoides J. E. Böhlke, 1960 (Dusky basslet)
 Lipogramma evides C. R. Robins & P. L. Colin, 1979 (Banded basslet)
 Lipogramma flavescens Gilmore & R. S. Jones, 1988 (Yellow basslet)
 Lipogramma haberorum C. C. Baldwin, Nonaka & D. R. Robertson, 2016 (Yellow-banded basslet) 
 Lipogramma klayi J. E. Randall, 1963 (Bicolor basslet)
 Lipogramma levinsoni C. C. Baldwin, Nonaka & D. R. Robertson, 2016 (Hourglass basslet) 
 Lipogramma regia C. R. Robins & P. L. Colin, 1979 (Royal basslet)
 Lipogramma robinsi Gilmore, 1997 (Yellow-bar basslet)
 Lipogramma rosea C. R. Gilbert, 1979 (Rosy basslet)
 Lipogramma trilineata J. E. Randall, 1963 (Three-line basslet)

References

Grammatidae
Marine fish genera
Taxa named by James Erwin Böhlke